Dehesht-e Olya (also Romanized as Dehesht-e ‘Olyā; also known as Dehesht) is a village in Miankuh Rural District, Chapeshlu District, Dargaz County, Razavi Khorasan Province, Iran. At the 2006 census, its population was 358, in 84 families.

References 

Populated places in Dargaz County